Sphagnum tenellum is a species of moss belonging to the family Sphagnaceae.

It is native to Europe, Japan and America.

References

tenellum